Madeleine may refer to:

Common meanings 
Madeleine (name), also Madeline, a feminine given name
Madeleine (cake), a traditional sweet cake from France
Mary Magdalene, also called the Madeleine

Arts and entertainment 
Madelein (1919 film), a German silent film
Madeleine (1950 film), directed by David Lean
Madeleine (2003 film), a South Korean romance
Madeleine (opera), a 1914 one-act opera by Victor Herbert
"Madeleine" (Backstreet Boys song), a track of In a World Like This
"Madeleine", a song by Jonathan Kelly, released as a single in 1972
"Madeleine", a song by Jacques Brel
Madeleine: One of Love's Jansenists, a 1919 novel by Hope Mirrlees

Places 
Madeleine (Paris Métro), near the Église de la Madeleine
Madeleine (river), in eastern France
Magdalen Islands (French: Îles de la Madeleine), a group of islands in the Gulf of St. Laurence, Quebec, Canada
Cathedral of the Madeleine (Salt Lake City, Utah), a Roman Catholic cathedral
Col de la Madeleine, a high mountain pass in the Alps in the department of Savoie in France
La Madeleine, Paris (Église de la Madeleine), a church in Paris

Other uses 
Madeleine Sophie Barat, a saint and founder of the Society of the Sacred Heart
MS Madeleine, a 1981 car ferry operating in Canada
"Madeleine", codename of Noor Inayat Khan (1914–1944), World War II Allied agent in Nazi-occupied France
Madeleine, an object persistence layer written in the Ruby programming language—see System prevalence

See also
 Madelaine
 La Madeleine (disambiguation)
 Madaline (disambiguation)
 Maddy (disambiguation)
 Madeline (disambiguation)
 Magdalene (disambiguation)